Dikwelle Vidanage Jayaratna Harischandra (11 March 1938 – 1 March 2013) (known as D. V. J. Harischandra) was a Sri Lankan consultant psychiatrist, orator, author, Buddhist scholar and a senior lecturer attached to the University of Ruhuna. He was also Head of the Psychiatrist Study Division UOR and Chairmanship of the Psychiatric Medical Science Study Council of the Colombo Post Graduate Medical Institute. He took part in many Buddhist television discussion programmes and was a key resource contributor to Nanapahana (a programme to which he actively participated for about 13 years, transmitted on Teleshan Networks) and Doramandalawa on ITN.

Early life
Harischandra was born on 11 March 1938 in Mihiripanna Thalpe Galle, a town in southwestern tip of Sri Lanka. He had his academic studies at St. Aloysius' College Galle. In 1964 Harischandra married Padma Gunawardana; they had three children, Neshantha Harischandra (Senior lecturer in English at UOR), Tolusha Harischandra (cardiothoracic specialist) and Navodya Harischandra (consultant psychiatrist)

Death 
Harischandra died on 1 March 2013 at the Kalubowila Teaching Hospital, where he had been admitted following a myocardial infarction.

References

Bibliography
 Psychiatric Aspects of Buddhist Jataka Stories 2ndedition Vijitha Yapa Publication 2016
 Jataka Geetha Sangrahaya 2012 VYPublication
 Budu dahama saha Vidyawa 2014 VYPublication

1938 births
2013 deaths
Academic staff of the University of Ruhuna
Alumni of St. Aloysius' College, Galle
People from Galle District
Sinhalese academics
Sinhalese physicians
Sri Lankan broadcasters
Sri Lankan Theravada Buddhists